Mamba South gas field is a giant offshore natural gas field in the Cabo Delgado Province, off the coast of Mozambique.
Discovered in October 2011 by Italian company Eni, it is one of the largest gas fields in the world, with up to 15 trillion cubic feet of natural gas in place, equivalent to 2 bboe.

References

Natural gas fields in Mozambique
Galp Energia